Apatelodes ardeola is a moth in the family Apatelodidae first described by Herbert Druce in 1887. It is found from the Mexican state of Tabasco and Panama to the Amazon region.

References

Apatelodidae
Moths described in 1887